Devil's Island is a 1926 American silent drama film produced and distributed by Chadwick Pictures and directed by Frank O'Connor. The film stars Pauline Frederick, Richard Tucker and Marian Nixon.

Cast
Pauline Frederick -  Jeannette Picto
Marian Nixon - Rose Marie 
Richard Tucker - Jean Valyon
George J. Lewis - Leon Valyon
William R. Dunn - Guillet
Leo White - Chico
John Miljan - Andre Le Fevier
Harry Northup - The Commandant

References

External links

1926 films
American silent feature films
Films based on short fiction
1926 drama films
Silent American drama films
Films set on Devil's Island
American black-and-white films
Films directed by Frank O'Connor
1920s American films